Simply Mortified is the second album by BS 2000, released on February 6, 2001.

Track listing
All songs written and composed by BS 2000, except where noted.

 "N.Y. Is Good" – 2:28
 "Sick For A Reason" – 1:44
 "It Feels Like" – 2:18
 "Yeah I Like BS" – 2:19
 "Buddy" – 1:46
 "Better Better" – 1:43
 "No Matter What Shape Your Stomach Is In" (Granville Sascha Burland) – 2:19
 "The Side To Side" – 3:01
 "Extractions" – 1:50
 "Boogie Bored" – 1:21
 "Wait A Minute" – 1:24
 "New Gouda" – 2:01
 "Save This For Davis" – 2:07
 "The Scrappy" – 3:01
 "Mr. Critic" – 1:22
 "Flossin At Lawson" – 2:00
 "Dig Deeper" – 1:09
 "The Dilemma" – 2:11
 "In The Basement" – 1:24
 "Dansk Party" – 2:55
 "Sing To Your Sink" (Bonus track)
 "Mom Song" (Bonus track)

Personnel

BS 2000 – vocals, all instruments, producer, mixing
James Murphy – mixing
Tim Goldsworthy – mixing
Dave Pinksy – additional mixing on "Boogie Bored", "Save This For Davis", "Mr. Critic" and "The Dilemma"
Janay North – vocals on "Yeah I Like BS"

References

2001 albums
BS 2000 albums
Grand Royal albums